Ezio Pizzoglio (27 April 1937 – 2006) was an Italian racing cyclist. He rode in the 1961 Tour de France.

References

1937 births
2006 deaths
Italian male cyclists
Place of birth missing